is a centaur on a horseshoe co-orbital configuration with Saturn. It was first observed on 1 November 2013 by the Outer Solar System Origins Survey at Mauna Kea Observatory in Hawaii, United States. The discovery was announced on 23 August 2021.

 is the first minor planet ever discovered in a horseshoe orbit with respect to Saturn. It orbits the Sun at a distance of 8.3–10.0 AU once every 27 years and 8 months (10,102 days; semi-major axis of 9.15 AU). Its orbit has an eccentricity of 0.09 and an inclination of 12° with respect to the ecliptic.

The object may have an origin among the trans-Neptunian population.

References

External links 
 

Minor planet object articles (unnumbered)

Co-orbital minor planets
Discoveries by OSSOS
Saturn
20131101